The Ruwenzori shrew (Ruwenzorisorex suncoides) is a species of mammal in the family Soricidae. It is the only species within the genus Ruwenzorisorex. It is found in Burundi, Democratic Republic of the Congo, Rwanda, and Uganda. It is semiaquatic, living along streams in tropical cloud forest.

References

White-toothed shrews
Mammals described in 1936
Taxonomy articles created by Polbot